Scholastic Corporation is an American multinational publishing, education, and media company that publishes and distributes books, comics, and educational materials for schools, teachers, parents, children, and educational institutions. Products are distributed via retail and online sales and through schools via reading clubs and book fairs. Clifford the Big Red Dog, a character created by Norman Bridwell in 1963, serves as Scholastic's official mascot.

History

Scholastic was founded in 1920 by Maurice R. Robinson near Pittsburgh, Pennsylvania to be a publisher of youth magazines. The first publication was The Western Pennsylvania Scholastic. It covered high school sports and social activities; the four-page magazine debuted on October 22, 1920, and was distributed in 50 high schools. In the 1940s, Scholastic entered the book club business. In the 1960s, international publishing locations were added in England 1964, New Zealand 1964, and Sydney 1968. Also in the 1960s, Scholastic entered the book publishing business. In the 1970s, Scholastic created its TV entertainment division. From 1975 until his death in 2021, Richard Robinson, who was the son of the corporation's founder, served as CEO and president. In 2000, Scholastic purchased Grolier for US$400 million. Scholastic became involved in a video collection in 2001. In July 2005, Scholastic determined that certain leases previously accounted for as operating leases should have been accounted for as capital leases. The cumulative effect, if recorded in the current year, would be material. As a result, it decided to restate its financial statements. A significant number of titles carried are based on media tie-ins and are considered lacking in literary and artistic merit by some critics. In February 2012, Scholastic bought Weekly Reader Publishing from Reader's Digest Association, and announced in July 2012 that it planned to discontinue separate issues of Weekly Reader magazines after more than a century of publication, and co-branded the magazines as Scholastic News/Weekly Reader. in December 2015, Scholastic launched the Scholastic Reads Podcasts. On October 22 2020, Scholastic celebrated its 100th anniversary.

Company structure
The business has three segments: Children Book Publishing & Distribution Trade, Book Clubs, and Book Fairs, Education, and International. Scholastic holds the perpetual US publishing rights to the Harry Potter and Hunger Games book series. Scholastic is the world's largest publisher and distributor of children's books and print and digital educational materials for pre-K to grade 12. In addition to Harry Potter and The Hunger Games, Scholastic is known for its school book clubs and book fairs, classroom magazines such as Scholastic News and Science World, and popular book series: Clifford the Big Red Dog, Goosebumps, The Magic School Bus, Captain Underpants, Animorphs, The Baby-Sitters Club, and I Spy.
Scholastic also publishes instructional reading and writing programs, and offers professional learning and consultancy services for school improvement. Clifford the Big Red Dog serves as the official mascot of Scholastic.

Marketing initiatives
The Scholastic Art & Writing awards was Founded in 1923 by Maurice R. Robinson, The Scholastic Art & Writing Awards, administered by the Alliance for Young Artists & Writers, is a competition which recognizes talented young artists and writers from across the United States.

Imprints and corporate divisions

Trade Publishing Imprints include:
 Arthur A. Levine Books, which specializes in fiction and non-fiction books for young readers. The imprint was founded at Scholastic in 1996 by Arthur Levine in New York City. The first book published by Arthur A. Levine Books was When She Was Good by Norma Fox Mazer in autumn of 1997. The imprint is most notable as the publisher for the American editions of the Harry Potter series by J. K. Rowling. In March 2019, Levine left Scholastic to form his own new publisher. Scholastic will retain Levine's back catalogue.
The Chicken House
Klutz Press
Orchard Books 
Scholastic Australia made up of Koala Books, Margaret Hamilton Books, Omnibus Books, and Scholastic Corporation.

Children's Press spelled  from 1945 to 1996. Founded in 1945, and originally headquartered in 1224 West Van Buren Street, Chicago, Illinois until its acquisition by Grolier in 1995, this press published various publications such as the Rookie Read-About series, A True Book series, Young People's series Young People's Animal Encyclopedia by Maurice Burton, Young People's Science Encyclopedia and Young People's Science Dictionary by the staff of National College of Education (now National Louis University), Young People's Illustrated Encyclopedia, and Young People's World) and also has a secondary imprint, Franklin Watts. It had a slogan "Childrens Books Are Important", with the heptagram with a slogan encircling it served as the press' alternate logo from 1945 to 1970. In 1995, Children's Press became a division of Grolier, moving from its original headquarters in Chicago to Danbury, Connecticut. It became an imprint of Scholastic Corporation five years later in 2000.

In 2005, Scholastic developed FASTT Math with Tom Snyder to help students with their proficiency with math skills, specifically being multiplication, division, addition, and subtraction through a series of games and memorization quizzes gauging the student's progress. in 2013, Scholastic developed System 44 with Houghton Mifflin Harcourt to help students encourage reading skills. In 2011, Scholastic developed READ 180 with Houghton Mifflin Harcourt to help students understand their reading skills.

Scholastic Entertainment

Scholastic Entertainment formerly Scholastic Productions and Scholastic Media is a corporate division
led by Deborah Forte since 1995.
It covers "all forms of media and consumer products, and is  four main groups – Productions, Marketing & Consumer Products, Interactive, and Audio." Weston Woods is its production studio, acquired in 1996, as was Soup2Nuts (best known for Dr. Katz, Professional Therapist, Science Court and Home Movies) from 2001 to 2015 before shutting down.

Scholastic has produced audiobooks such as the Caldecott/Newbery Collection; Television adaptations such as Clifford the Big Red Dog, Clifford's Puppy Days, Maya & Miguel, WordGirl, Animorphs, The Magic School Bus, 2004 DVDs of I Spy, Goosebumps, His Dark Materials, Puppy Place, and feature films such as The Indian in the Cupboard, The Mighty, the Harry Potter film series, Tuck Everlasting, Clifford's Really Big Movie, The Golden Compass, the Hunger Games film series, Goosebumps, Captain Underpants: The First Epic Movie, Goosebumps 2: Haunted Halloween, Mortal Engines, Clifford the Big Red Dog, and The Bad Guys. It will produce Smile, Voyagers!, My Secret Identity, Charles in Charge, The Magic School Bus rides Again, and the upcoming film Trunks. In 1985, Scholastic Productions teamed up with Karl-Lorimar Home Video, a home video unit of Lorimar Productions, to form the line Scholastic-Lorimar Home Video, whereas Scholastic would produce made-for-video programming, and became a best-selling video line for kids, and the pact expired for two years, whereas Scholastic would team up with leading independent family video distributor and a label of International Video Entertainment, Family Home Entertainment, to distribute made-for-video programming for the next three years.

Book clubs
Scholastic book clubs are offered at schools in many countries. Typically, teachers administer the program to the students in their own classes, but in some cases, the program is administered by a central contact for the entire school. Within Scholastic, Reading Clubs is a separate unit (compared to, e.g., Education). Reading clubs are arranged by age/grade. Book club operators receive "Classroom Funds" redeemable only for Scholastic Corporation products.

Scholastic Parents Media
Scholastic Parents Media publishes the Scholastic Parent & Child magazine. The group also specializes in online advertising sales and custom programs designed for parents with children aged 0–6.

See also

 List of English-language book publishing companies
 Books in the United States

References

External links

 

 
1920 establishments in Pennsylvania
American companies established in 1920
Book distributors
Book publishing companies based in New York (state)
Book publishing companies of the United States
Children's book publishers
Companies listed on the Nasdaq
Education companies established in 1920
Education companies of the United States
Educational publishing companies
Mass media companies of the United States
Multinational companies based in New York City
Multinational publishing companies
Publishing companies based in New York City
Publishing companies established in 1920